Magnus Brechtken (born 21 March 1964) is a German historian. He is the deputy director of the Institute of Contemporary History in Munich and teaches at the Ludwig Maximilians University in Munich. In 2017 he wrote  a biographical study of Albert Speer which won the 2017 .

History 

Since 2012 Brechtken has been deputy director of the Institute of Contemporary History in Munich and teaches as an adjunct professor at the Ludwig Maximilians Universität.

Albert Speer biography

In 2017 Brechtken published a biographical study of Albert Speer that received a positive reception from critics and reached No. 8 in the Der Spiegel bestseller list. Sven Felix Kellerhoff, reviewing the book in Die Welt, said it was now impossible to spread the myth that Speer was the "good Nazi". Robert Probst said in the Süddeutsche Zeitung that Brechtken had produced a comprehensive account of Speer and praised the depth and rigour of the work.

References

External links 
 Seite von Prof. Dr. Magnus Brechtken beim Institut für Zeitgeschichte (IfZ) München 
 Markus Brechtken: Das Lügengebäude des Albert Speer. WDR 5, Redezeit, 29. Juni 2017, 11.05 - 11.35 (Audiodatei), Interview zu seiner Biografie: Albert Speer, 2017.

20th-century German historians
Historians of Nazism
1964 births
Living people
21st-century German historians